Dirce Repossi (originally known as Zeme Repossi) is an Italian jewellery brand founded in 1929, during the Art Déco era, by Camillo Repossi and Giusto Zeme.

In 1961, Camillo's daughter, Dirce Repossi, inherited the family business and founded the eponymous brand. A generation later, the company went to her daughter Vittoria Verderio Repossi. Since Vittoria Repossi's death in 2020, the company has been owned by her son Jeremy Pession, a graduate of the Polytechnic University of Turin.

Inspiration 
Established during the period of Art Déco, Dirce Repossi's first jewelry was influenced by this era's style and design. It was a globally popular style that affected many areas of design. This Art movement not only influenced the architecture, but also consumer products such as automobiles, furniture, textile, clocks and jewelry.

Dirce Repossi was one of the many brands influenced by this movement. They play with the modern reassessment of the classic style, the colors and lights, the forms and dimensions to create timeless pieces of jewelry. "Emozione di un Gioieillo senza tempo" (emotion of a timeless jewel) was their slogan.

In Europe, the 4 years of suffering and privation caused by the World War I have led to a period of creativity and joie de vivre. This new freedom is expressed into the Artistic movement of that period. Nowadays known as Art Déco, this movement has reached most of the European countries during the 1930s.

In France, this artistic movement has inspired many artists such as: Jean Després, Gérard Sandoz, Jean Fouquet, Raymond Templier ... They have given their work to brands like Cartier and Van Cleef and Arpels.

In Italy, "Vivere e dimenticare il passato" (live and forget the past) was the new motto.

Story 

1929: Inspiration from the Art Déco movement lead to the founding of Zeme Repossi, a brand co-founded by Camillo Repossi and Giusto Zeme with the 92 AL hallmark in Valenza, a city known for having highest number of artisan goldsmiths in Italy. They both have great passion in Jewelry and watches.

1930s: The 1925 Paris Exposition Internationale Des Arts Décoratifs et Industriels Modernes, with its avant-garde ideas and imagery inspired from machinery and modernisation, particularly inspired Camillo Repossi and Giusto Zeme in their early creations.

1940s: During World War II, long conflict in Europe jewelry production came to a stop in Italy due to the prohibition to work precious metal during those times and the harshness the population was facing. Still, there are some sketches dated back at this time belonging to Camillo Repossi, secretly designing Beauty despite the constraint of the time.

1951: Camillo Repossi dies, and his daughter Dirce took over his legacy, continuing the family business with her father's partner Giusto Zeme.

1961: 32 years after the birth of the brand, Zeme retires and leaves the company to Dirce. The company was renamed Dirce Repossi, with the 1065 AL hallmark. Classical and timeless creation were crafted since then.

1983: Vittoria Verderio Repossi, Dirce's daughter, graduate GIA Jewelry Designer in Santa Monica joins the company.

1990: Dirce Repossi collaborates with the Italian painter and sculptor Salvatore Fiume, for the charity initiative Un Gioiello Per la Vita with Sotheby's, promoted by AISM Associazione Italiana Sclerosi Multipla. 1996: The company receives the S. Eligio Award from the city of Valenza.

2005-2006: The brand wins second place at the Tahitian Pearl Trophy with its original design ring “Aconcagua”.

2008: Dirce Repossi dies and leaves the company to her daughter Vittoria currently living in Valenza (Italy). She continues the family business and tradition, implementing the international development.

2016: Relaunch of Dirce Repossi, with new bridal and fashion jewelry collection. Relaunch of the new company image with the new logo.

2018: Dirce announced its "You Are My Universe" jewelry collection in New York & Hong Kong. The collection was designed exclusively for Dirce by Omar Torres, each style is inspired by the infinity of the universe and features a swirling spiral motif to symbolize everlasting love.

2019: Celebrating Dirce ninetieth anniversary announced its "You Are My Universe" in Mainland China.

Craftsmanship and Expertise  

Dirce Repossi's has its own workshop, in which the company's jewelry is created. One of the world famous British Jewelry Asprey and Garrard was collaborating with Dirce Repossi's workshop.

In the late 1930s, many of the young goldsmiths who now have their own jewelry learned and were trained at the Zeme Repossi workshop. The Foral Institute in Valenza, (where the goldsmiths, setters, gem cutters and jewelry designers are trained) has honored the memory of Zeme/Repossi by naming the H classroom with the company name.

Dirce Repossi historical archive conserves, through a dated system of Certification, the story and registration of each Dirce Repossi creation. 

Every Dirce Repossi creation is accompanied by its certificate of authenticity issued by the company, stating the specifics of the jewelry such as characteristics of the central stone, the metal, the style and the collection it belongs to.

References 

Gemme E Gioielli - Materiali e artisti, Carlo Cumo and Claude Mazloum edited by Gremese Editore 1996.
Gioielli collezione, Collana Egoista edited by Inedita Editrice 1991-1992.
Un Gioiello per la vita, by Associazione Orafa Valenza

Jewellery companies of Italy
Valenza